Janet Culp (born February 24, 1982) is an American synchronized swimmer who competed in the women's team event at the 2008 Summer Olympics.

She graduated from Santa Clara University in 2004.

References

1982 births
Living people
American synchronized swimmers
Olympic synchronized swimmers of the United States
Synchronized swimmers at the 2008 Summer Olympics
People from Denver
Place of birth missing (living people)